"With Her Head Tucked Underneath Her Arm" is a darkly humorous song, written in 1934 with lyrics by R. P. Weston and Bert Lee and music by Harris Weston. It was originally performed by Stanley Holloway. It tells of how the ghost of Anne Boleyn haunts the Tower of London, seeking revenge on Henry VIII for having her beheaded.

It has been covered by many performers, including:
British actor Cyril Smith in 1934.
Roy Barbour in 1934 on Rex Records 8342 A, a 78 rpm release, with The Lion and Albert on the B side 
Rudy Vallee in the late 1930s with "The Old Sow Song" on the reverse.
The Kingston Trio on their 1960 album Sold Out,. They gave an American twist to the soccer-related lines "And when they've had a few they shout 'Is Ars'nal going to win?'/They think it's Alec James, instead of poor old Ann Boleyn", changing them to "And when they've had a few they shout 'Is Army going to win?'/They think that it's Red Grange, instead of poor old Ann Boleyn"
The Barron Knights in 1966.
Caryl P. Weiss, whose 1981 recording has been a mainstay on Dr. Demento's Halloween show.
Bobby Clancy, who recorded it twice under the title "Anne Boleyn," once with The Clancy Brothers on their 1982 Live album, and again on his 2000 solo album, Make Me a Cup.

In media
It has appeared in many shows, including:
The song was used in the serial Spin and Marty on the Mickey Mouse Club TV show in the late 1950s.
During the episode "Whine Club" of the TV series Frasier, Daphne Moon sings the song due to the fact that she was drunk on a Bloody Mary cocktail.
During the episode "They do it with Mirrors" of the TV series Marple. The convicts sing together an excerpt of the song before the theater play.

It was referenced in the novel, Murder, She Wrote: A Question of Murder, and in the children's novel, Otherwise Known as Sheila the Great by Judy Blume.

References

External links 
Lyrics of "With Her Head Tucked Underneath Her Arm"

Songs about ghosts
Songs about queens
1934 songs
The Kingston Trio songs
Songs written by R. P. Weston
Cultural depictions of Anne Boleyn
Cultural depictions of Henry VIII
Songs written by Bert Lee
Novelty songs